Grace United Methodist Church is a historic Methodist church located at 9th and West Streets in Wilmington, New Castle County, Delaware. It was designed by architect Thomas Dixon and built in 1868.  It is constructed of serpentine stone of a light pea green color in the Victorian Gothic style.  The church building measures approximately 166 feet by 102 feet, 6 inches.  It features a needle spire that rises to 186 feet and is topped by a Celtic cross.

It was added to the National Register of Historic Places in 1983. It was dedicated in 1868 to the Union victory at Gettysburg, which saved the city from being ransacked by the advancing Confederates.

References

United Methodist churches in Delaware
Churches in Wilmington, Delaware
Churches on the National Register of Historic Places in Delaware
Churches completed in 1868
19th-century Methodist church buildings in the United States
National Register of Historic Places in Wilmington, Delaware